Verkhnenovokutlumbetyevo is a rural locality (village)  in Matveyevsky District of Orenburg Oblast, Russia. Population: .

Verkhnenovokutlumbetevo has the longest fused (without spaces and hyphens) name of any settlement in Russia along with the village Starokozmodemyanovskoe in the Tambov Region (23 letters).

References

Rural localities in Orenburg Oblast